State Highway 60 (SH 60) is a state highway in Colorado that connects Campion, Johnstown and Milliken. SH 60's western terminus is at U.S. Route 287 (US 287) in Campion, and the eastern terminus is at US 85 in Houston.

Route description
SH 60 begins at US 287 in Campion. Continuing east, the route passes under Interstate 25 (I-25) before jumping south to I-25's exit 252 diamond interchange and continuing eastbound. SH 60 then passes through Johnstown as First Street before intersecting SH 257 and entering Milliken as Broad Street.  east of Milliken, the route abruptly turns south before crossing the South Platte River and terminating at US 85 in the unorganized community of Houston.

History 
The route was established in the early 1920's, having much of the same routing as it does today. The route was paved from Johnstown to US 85 by 1939 and was entirely paved by 1946. When I-25 was completed in the area in the early 1960's, SH 60 was split in two, having not been given an exit for the northern section.

Major intersections

References

External links

060
Transportation in Larimer County, Colorado
Transportation in Weld County, Colorado